Jamie Fitzgerald  (born 14 February 1979) is an Australian former professional rugby league footballer who played in the 1990s and 2000s.

Background
Fitzgerald was born in Mudgee, New South Wales.

Playing career
Fitzgerald played for the North Sydney Bears in 1999, the St. George Illawarra Dragons from 2000 to 2001, the South Sydney Rabbitohs from 2002 to 2003 and finally the Newcastle Knights in 2004.  Fitzgerald played in North Sydney's final ever game as a first grade side which was a 28-18 victory over North Queensland in Townsville.

References

1979 births
Living people
Australian rugby league players
Newcastle Knights players
North Sydney Bears players
People from Mudgee
Rugby league hookers
Rugby league locks
Rugby league players from New South Wales
Rugby league second-rows
South Sydney Rabbitohs players
St. George Illawarra Dragons players